Laboratory experiments of speciation have been conducted for all four modes of speciation: allopatric, peripatric, parapatric, and sympatric; and various other processes involving speciation: hybridization, reinforcement, founder effects, among others. Most of the experiments have been done on flies, in particular Drosophila fruit flies. However, more recent studies have tested yeasts, fungi, and even viruses.

It has been suggested that laboratory experiments are not conducive to vicariant speciation events (allopatric and peripatric) due to their small population sizes and limited generations. Most estimates from studies of nature indicate that speciation takes hundreds of thousands to millions of years. On the other hand, many species are thought to have speciated faster and more recently, such as the European flounders (Platichthys flesus) that spawn in pelagic and demersal zones—having allopatrically speciated in under 3000 generations.

Table of experiments 
Six publications have attempted to compile, review, and analyze the experimental research on speciation:
 John Ringo, David Wood, Robert Rockwell, and Harold Dowse in 1985;
 William R. Rice and Ellen E. Hostert in 1993; 
 Ann-Britt Florin and Anders Ödeen in 2002; 
 Mark Kirkpatrick and Virginie Ravigné in 2002; 
 Jerry A. Coyne and H. Allen Orr in 2004; and 
 James D. Fry in 2009. 

The table summarizes the studies and data reviewed in these publications. It also references several contemporary experiments and is non-exhaustive.
In the table, multiple numbers separated by semi-colons in the generations column indicate that multiple experiments were conducted. The replications (in parentheses) indicates the number of populations used in the experiments—i.e. how many times the experiment was replicated. 
Various types of selection have been imposed on experimental populations and are indicated by the selection type column. Negative or positive results of each experiment are provided by the reproductive isolation column. 
Pre-zygotic reproductive isolation means that the reproducing individuals in the populations were unable to produce offspring (effectively a positive result). 
Post-zygotic isolation means that the reproducing individuals were able to produce offspring but they were either sterile or inviable (a positive result as well). 
Negative results are indicated by "none"—that is, the experiments did not result in reproductive isolation.

See also
 Directed evolution

References 

Speciation
Experiments